The 1873 Shaftesbury by-election was held on 30 August 1873.  The by-election was held due to the succession to the peerage of the incumbent MP of the Liberal Party, George Glyn.  It was won by the Conservative candidate Vere Fane Benett-Stanford.

References

1873 in England
1873 elections in the United Kingdom
By-elections to the Parliament of the United Kingdom in Dorset constituencies
19th century in Dorset